CKLH-FM is a Canadian radio station, broadcasting at 102.9 FM in Hamilton, Ontario. The station broadcasts an adult hits format branded as Bounce 102.9. The station is owned by Bell Media. CKLH's studios are located on Upper Wentworth Street in Hamilton, while its transmitter is located atop the Niagara Escarpment near Burlington.

History
The station received CRTC approval on May 8, 1986, and was launched on October 7, 1986, by Armadale Communications, the owner of CKOC. The "LH" in the call sign stood for Les Horton, CKOC's first broadcast engineer. The station aired an easy listening format as K103 FM. On June 1, 1992, CKLH flipped to adult contemporary, and rebranded as 102.9 K-Lite.

Armadale sold the stations to London Communications in 1993. London Communications subsequently sold them to Telemedia in 1999, and Telemedia was itself acquired by Standard Broadcasting in 2002. In October 2007, Astral Media acquired Standard Broadcasting's terrestrial radio and television assets, including CKLH. Shortly after Astral acquired the station, CKLH adopted a more Adult Top 40 format; this ended in November 2009 when the station returned to its adult contemporary status after Boxing Day 2009, and regarding the flip from AC to adult hits at then-sister CJEZ in Toronto, which became CHBM after that.

With the merger of Astral Media and Bell Media, CKLH became a Bell Media owned station on July 5, 2013.

As part of a mass format reorganization by Bell Media, on May 18, 2021, CKLH flipped to adult hits under the Bounce branding.

Former logo

Notes
The 102.9 FM frequency in Hamilton was previously used by an unrelated radio station called CJSH-FM which was owned by The Hamilton Spectator that operated from 1948 until it shutdown in 1954.

References

External links
 Bounce 102.9
 
 

Klh
Klh
Klh
Radio stations established in 1986
1986 establishments in Ontario